Liu Jin (born 1967) is a Chinese banker who is the current president of the Bank of China, in office since April 2021. He previously served as president of China Everbright Bank.

Biography
Born in 1967, Liu graduated from Shandong University with a master's degree in English language and literature.

After university, he served in various posts in Industrial and Commercial Bank of China before being promoted to vice president of the China Development Bank in September 2018.

In December 2019, he became executive director of China Everbright Group, concurrently serving as president of China Everbright Bank since January 2020.

He was appointed deputy party secretary of the Bank of China in February 2021, concurrently holding the president position since April of the same year.

References

1967 births
Living people
Shandong University alumni
Chinese bankers